Queen Charlotte Sound is a sound of the Pacific Ocean in British Columbia, Canada, between  Vancouver Island in the south and Haida Gwaii in the north. It merges with Hecate Strait in the north and Queen Charlotte Strait in the south.

Queen Charlotte Sound is part of the Inside Passage shipping route.

Definition
According to the BCGNIS, the northern boundary of Queen Charlotte Sound is defined as a line running from the southernmost point of Price Island to Cape St James on Kunghit Island, the southernmost point of Haida Gwaii. The western boundary is a line from Cape St James to Cape Scott at the north end of Vancouver Island. The southern boundary runs along the coast of Vancouver Island from Cape Scott to Cape Sutil, then to Cape Caution on the mainland. An older definition placed the northern boundary as a line from the southernmost point of Aristazabal Island to Cape St James.

History
Queen Charlotte Sound was named by James Strange on August 5, 1786, in honour of Charlotte of Mecklenburg-Strelitz, the wife of King George III. Strange was the leader of a fur trading expedition of two vessels, Captain Cook, under Captain Henry Lawrie, and Experiment, under Captain John Guise. During a boat excursion up Goletas Channel Strange saw an opening ahead and named it Queen Charlotte Sound. The body of water he named was what is today known as Queen Charlotte Strait. For some time Queen Charlotte Strait was also called Queen Charlotte Sound, until 1920 when the BCGNIS and Hydrographic Service distinguished between Queen Charlotte Sound and Queen Charlotte Strait. George Vancouver, who used the name in his maps and writings, wrote that the sound was named by Mr. S. Wedgeborough, in command of the Experiment under James Strange, but Vancouver was wrong—Strange was the one who gave the name.

References

External links

Bays of British Columbia
Central Coast of British Columbia
Sounds of British Columbia
Charlotte of Mecklenburg-Strelitz